Wiegold is a Welsh surname. Notable people with the surname include:

 James Wiegold (1934–2009), Welsh mathematician

Surnames of Welsh origin